Pierre Hola (born 9 June 1978) is an Australia-born rugby union footballer. He has represented Tonga and currently plays his club rugby in the Australian Shute Shield for Eastwood.

Career
Hola made his debut for Tonga in September 1998 in a match against Samoa, and has since  earned 57 test caps, including representing Tonga at the 2003 Rugby World Cup in Australia where he was their top scorer and the 2007 Rugby World Cup. Other memorable moments was being the sole point scorer for Tonga vs The All Blacks and sending Canadian captain Al Charon unconscious off the field in his final match after accidentally knocking him out.

He has scored 465 points for Tonga. He also holds for the most points scored in one match for Tonga (44) against South Korea which included 2 tries and 17 from 17 conversions (world record). He has represented Tonga in the IRB Pacific 5 Nations where he was one of the players of the tournament for them as well as in the 2007 IRB Pacific Nations Cup..

2007 RWC
He was an integral part of Tonga's successful rugby world cup 2007 campaign again being their top scorer kicking 44 points for the 2nd consecutive world cup tournament. A memorable moment for him came from the hard-fought 30-25 loss to the eventual champions South Africa. Trapped inside the Tongan 22, he launched an audacious cross field kick to set up a brilliant counterattack which resulted in one of the tries of the tournament (scored by Viliami Vaki).

Pacific Nations Cup
Hola was a late call-up for the Tongan team in the 2008 IRB Pacific Nations Cup. He would play in their 35-13 loss to Japan, 15-20 defeat to Samoa and 27-16 victory over Fiji. He has since been selected for the 2008 Pacific Islanders rugby union team to tour Europe in November playing games against France, England and Italy.

External links
 IRB Profile

1978 births
Australian rugby union players
Australian sportspeople of Tongan descent
Living people
Rugby union players from Sydney
Rugby union fullbacks
Rugby union fly-halves
Kobelco Kobe Steelers players
Expatriate rugby union players in Japan
Tonga international rugby union players
Pacific Islanders rugby union players
Tongan expatriate rugby union players
Expatriate rugby union players in Australia
Expatriate rugby union players in Italy
Tongan expatriate sportspeople in Australia
Tongan expatriate sportspeople in Japan
Tongan expatriate sportspeople in Italy